The 2017 Sam Houston State Bearkats football team represented Sam Houston State University in the 2017 NCAA Division I FCS football season. The Bearkats were led by fourth-year head coach K. C. Keeler and played their home games at Bowers Stadium. They were a member of the Southland Conference. They finished the season 12–2, 8–1 in Southland play to finish in second place. They received an at-large bid to the FCS playoffs where they defeated South Dakota in the first round and Kennesaw State in the quarterfinals before losing in the semifinals to North Dakota State.

Previous season
The Bearkats finished the season 12–1 overall and 9–0 in Southland play to win the Southland Conference title. They went undefeated (11–0) during the regular season. They received the Southland's automatic bid to the FCS Playoffs where they defeated Chattanooga the second round, only to lose in the quarterfinals to FCS national champion James Madison.

Schedule

Source:

Game summaries

Richmond

Sources:

@ Prairie View A&M 

Sources:

Nicholls

Sources:

@ Central Arkansas

Sources:

vs. Stephen F. Austin

Sources:

Northwestern State

Sources:

Lamar

Sources:

@ Southeastern Louisiana

Sources:

Incarnate Word

Sources:

@ Abilene Christian

Sources:

Houston Baptist

Sources:

FCS Playoffs

South Dakota–Second Round

Sources:

Kennesaw State–Quarterfinals

Sources:

@ North Dakota State–Semifinals

Sources:

Ranking movements

References

Sam Houston State
Sam Houston Bearkats football seasons
Sam Houston State
Sam Houston State Bearkats football